Fortin is a surname, and may refer to:

Artists:
 Augustin Félix Fortin (1763–1832), French painter
 Charles Fortin (1815–1865), French painter
 Marc-Aurèle Fortin (1888–1970), Québécois painter
 Robert-Émile Fortin (1945–2004), Québécois painter

Politicians:
 André-Gilles Fortin (1943–1977), Social Credit Party member of the Canadian House of Commons
 Dean Fortin (born 1959), Canadian mayor of Victoria
 Émile Fortin (1878–1936), Conservative member of the Canadian House of Commons
 Gilles Fortin (born 1946), Québécois provincial politician
 Jean-Baptiste Fortin (1764–1841) farmer and Canadian political figure
 Jean-François Fortin (politician) (born 1973), Bloc Québécois member of the Canadian House of Commons
 Joseph-Édouard Fortin (1884–1949), Québécois provincial politician
 Louis Fortin (1920–2005), Progressive Conservative party member of the Canadian House of Commons
 Louis-Napoléon Fortin (1850–1892), physician and Québécois provincial politician
 Pierre-Étienne Fortin (1823–1888), Quebec physician Conservative member of the Canadian House of Commons
 Roméo Fortin (1886–1953), Québécois provincial politician
 Thomas Fortin (1853–1933), Québécois lawyer, judge, educator and member of the Canadian House of Commons

Sportsmen:
 Jean-François Fortin (ice hockey) (born 1979), Canadian ice hockey player
 Marc-Antoine Fortin (born 1987), Canadian footballer
 Marco Fortin (born 1974), Italian goalkeeper
 Ray Fortin (born 1941), Canadian ice hockey player
 Richard Fortin (cricketer) (born 1941), Singapore-born English cricketer
 Roger Fortin (born 1951), Canadian boxer
 Roman Fortin (born 1967), American football player
 Stéphane Fortin (born 1974), Canadian football player

Others:
 Anne Fortin (born 1957), professor of accounting
 Dan Fortin, general manager of IBM Canada
 Dédé Fortin, (1962–2000), singer in Québécois band Les Colocs
 Ernest Fortin (1923–2002), American professor of theology
 Fred Fortin (born 1971), Canadian singer-songwriter
 Jean-François Fortin (chairman) (born 1947), French businessman and football club chairman
 Jean Nicolas Fortin, (1750–1831), French maker of scientific instruments, and editor of Atlas céleste de Flamstéed
 Judy Fortin (born 1961), American broadcaster
 Nicole Fortin (born c. 1954), Canadian economist
 Richard Fortin (businessman) (born 1949/50), Canadian businessman

See also

 

French-language surnames